Hruzko-Lomivka is an urban-type settlement in Makiivka Municipality (district) in Donetsk Oblast of eastern Ukraine. Population:

Demographics
Native language as of the Ukrainian Census of 2001:
 Ukrainian 47.41%
 Russian 52.31%
 Moldovan (Romanian) 0.14%

References

Urban-type settlements in Donetsk Raion